Radhe is the vocative case of Radha, a Hindu goddess who is the consort of Krishna.

It may also refer to:
 Radhe family, a Swedish family
 Radhe (2017 film), a Nepalese film
 Radhe (2021 film), an Indian Hindi film
 Radhe (upcoming film), an Indian Bhojpuri film

See also
 Radhe radhe (disambiguation)
 Radha
 Radhe Radhe